The Bedfordshire Women's cricket team is the women's representative cricket team for the English historic county of Bedfordshire. They played their first recorded match in 1887, against Huntingdonshire Women. They joined the Women's Twenty20 Cup in 2011, and played in the tournament until 2014. Since then, the side has not competed in any major county tournaments, and exists only at youth team level. Bedfordshire are partnered with the regional team Sunrisers.

Seasons

Women's Twenty20 Cup

See also
 Bedfordshire County Cricket Club
 Sunrisers (women's cricket)

References

Cricket in Bedfordshire
Women's cricket teams in England